The Panasonic Lumix DMC-LX3, or LX3, is a high-end compact "point and shoot" camera launched by Panasonic in late 2008 to succeed the Lumix LX2.

Features 
The LX3 has:.
 High-Sensitivity 1/1.63-inch CCD 10.1 Megapixels and Venus Engine IV up to ISO3200 at Full Resolution.
 24 mm Wide Angle f/2.0–2.8 LEICA DC VARIO-SUMMICRON Lens with 2.5x Optical Zoom.
 Optional full Manual Operation.
 HD Motion Images and HD Output.
 3.0-inch (460,000-dot) 3:2 Ratio LCD.
 "Intelligent Auto Mode" with AF Tracking.

Accessories 
DMW LW46 wide angle conversion lens, 35 mm equivalent  18 mm.
Panasonic genuine leather case

Similar cameras 
Similar high-end compact cameras are the LX3's sister camera, the Leica D-Lux 4, the Canon PowerShot S90, and the Samsung TL500/EX1.  A remarkable quality of the LX3 vs. the S90 is that the aperture of the LX3 only gradually, steadily narrows from 2.0 to 2.8, whereas that for the S90 quickly narrows.  (And in later versions, the LX5 retained this gradual narrowing through the extended range (24-90 equiv.); the LX7 retained the extended range and gradual aperture narrowing while opening a full stop wider (1.4 - 2.3!!).)

Leica D-Lux 4 
The Leica D-Lux 4 is very similar to the LX3, sharing most of the design and the mechanical components. The main difference is the more pronounced grip on the LX3, the firmware which processes the JPG files in warmer hues on the D-Lux4 and the fact that D-Lux4 comes bundled with Capture One image processing software.

Upgrades 
Panasonic has continued to improve the firmware. The v. 2.1 firmware claims improved performance, a 20% improvement in autofocus speed, and new features such as a 1:1 aspect ratio and focus resume.

On July 30, 2010, Panasonic released another firmware update for the LX3. The stated reason behind the update is 'Optimization of software processing', with an additional comment stating 'Change in software version has no effect on camera performance'. 

Panasonic launched the successor to the LX3, the LX5, on 21 July 2010.

The latest model features a revised sensor, longer zoom range and improved control layout without fundamentally changing the existing model's formula. It offers a more flexible 24–90 mm equivalent lens with a bright f/2.0–3.3 maximum aperture range and a comparatively large 10MP sensor in a small body. The body itself is barely changed compared to the LX3 – gaining an improved hand grip, clickable control dial, direct movie record button and a 1:1 position on the aspect ratio slider. Most significantly it gains a connector to add the DMW-LVF1 electronic viewfinder originally launched with the GF1. Other than this, the LX5 gains the AVCHD Lite format for its 720p video, and its image stabilization is branded with the company's latest 'Power O.I.S' designation.

Notes

External links

 Lumix Official Website UK
 Lumix Official Website USA
 Lumix DMC-LX3 Photos
 Official Website Global
 LX3 Official Website Global
 DPReview – Panasonic DMC-LX3

Panasonic Lumix cameras
Cameras introduced in 2008
Digital cameras with CCD image sensor